Jean-Marie Lang (13 May 1943 – 16 July 2021) was a French doctor and professor of immuno-oncology.

Biography
Lang studied under  at Louis Pasteur University. He wrote his thesis on "mixed cultures of lymphocytes: search for a specific inhibition of the immunological response to the antigenic specificities of the donor in kidney transplant patients" in 1971. Alongside Professor Willy Rozenbaum, head of the Hôpital Saint-Louis and Sophie Delaunay, head of the Ensemble pour une Solidarité Thérapeutique Hospitalière En Réseau, he signed a cooperation agreement with the Laotian Minister of Health, Pomnek Dalaloy, and the French Ambassador to Laos. He retired in 2011.

Jean-Marie Lang died in Oberhausbergen on 16 July 2021 at the age of 78.

References

People from the Territoire de Belfort
University of Strasbourg alumni
20th-century French physicians
21st-century French physicians
Academic staff of the University of Strasbourg
1943 births
2021 deaths